Trogloraptor is a genus of large spiders found in the caves of southwestern Oregon. It is the sole genus in the family Trogloraptoridae, and includes only one species, Trogloraptor marchingtoni. They are remarkable for having hook-like claws on the raptorial last segments of their legs.

Trogloraptor belongs to one of only three new spider families described since 1990. The specific name is in honor of the amateur cave biologist and deputy sheriff Neil Marchington.

Discovery
The spiders were first collected in 2010 by Geo Graening, Neil Marchington, Ron Davis and Daniel Snyder, cave conservationists from the Western Cave Conservancy. They were described in 2012 by a research team consisting of arachnologists Charles Griswold, Tracy Audisio and Joel Ledford of the California Academy of Sciences. The male holotype was recovered from the M2 cave near Grants Pass, Oregon, on July 29, 2010. The female holotype was recovered from a cave in Josephine County, Oregon, on September 16, 2010.

Lead researcher Griswold claimed that Trogloraptor might explain the legends of giant cave spiders in the area. The discovery is also notable because only two other new spider families have been described since 1990. The American arachnologist Norman Platnick commented that it was "...as fascinating to arachnologists as the discovery of a new dinosaur is to paleontologists."

Taxonomy
Trogloraptor includes only one species, Trogloraptor marchingtoni, and is the only genus in the monotypic family Trogloraptoridae. It was initially suggested that Trogloraptor was a primitive member of the six-eyed spider superfamily Dysderoidea.  However, Trogloraptor exhibits several unique features, including primitive respiratory systems, that justify its assignment to a separate family. The family probably diverged from other spiders about 130 million years ago, which would make it another notable relict taxon from North America. A 2014 study based on ribosomal DNA found that Trogloraptor fell outside the Dysderoidea and concluded that it should not be included in this clade.

The specific name is in honor of Neil Marchington. The generic name Trogloraptor means "cave robber", in reference to the spider's habitat and hooked raptorial tarsi.

Distribution
Additional live specimens recovered in 2010 and 2011 from Oregon were all found deep inside caves. Except for a single juvenile specimen recovered from the understory debris of old growth redwood forests of northwest California, none have been found outside the caves. This specimen has different markings than T. marchingtoni and may represent a new undescribed species.

The family Trogloraptoridae may have had a wider distribution given that redwood forests encompassed a far greater area in North America during the Pliocene (about 5 mya). Other species may still be present in other caves.

Description

The entire body is yellow-brown, except for a dark brown V-shaped mark on the cephalothorax, the orange-brown chelicerae, and the purple-brown abdomen (opisthosoma) with a series of faint light-colored chevron markings. The cephalothorax carapace is pear-shaped with a heart-shaped sternum. The abdomen is oval and sparsely covered with small bristles (setae). The males possess enlarged piriform pedipalps.

The spiders are unique in the flexible and teethed hook-like claws on the last segments (tarsus) of their legs. These elongated claws resemble those of spiders in the family Gradungulidae of Australia and New Zealand, but the two families are only distantly related. Hooked tarsal claws are also present to a lesser extent in the unrelated genera Doryonychus of Tetragnathidae, Hetrogriffus of Thomisidae and Celaenia of Araneidae.

Ecology
Trogloraptor spin simple webs with only a few strands, hung from the roofs of caves. Griswold et al. stated that the claws may have a significant function in capturing prey. Similar to the Nelson cave spider of New Zealand (Spelungula cavernicola, a gradungulid), Trogloraptor probably dangle upside down from their webs, snatching at passing flying insects with their claws. However their exact prey remains unknown. Captured live specimens were raised in climate-controlled laboratory conditions in an effort to find out. These specimens were offered moths, crickets and other spiders as food; but these were declined and the specimens starved after two weeks. This may indicate a preference for very specific prey.

Like most spiders, Trogloraptor possess venom glands. However, the venom is not known to be harmful to humans. The spiders themselves are very shy and unaggressive. They immediately flee illumination.

See also

 Troglobite, cave-dwelling animals
 List of troglobites
 Cave conservation
 Tayshaneta myopica, the tooth cave spider of Texas
 Meta menardi, the European cave spider
 Tartarus, a genus of ancient cave spiders from Australia
 Dysderidae, woodlouse hunters
 Segestriidae, tube-dwelling spiders
 Cryptomaster behemoth, arachnid discovered in southwest Oregon

References

External links

Western Cave Conservancy

Cave spiders
Araneomorphae
Monotypic Araneomorphae genera
Spiders of the United States
Endemic fauna of the United States

Biota of Oregon
Fauna of the Northwestern United States